Leonard "Buck" Jenkins (born February 15, 1971) is an American basketball coach and former professional player who is the head coach of the boys varsity team at the Riverwood International Charter School. He played college basketball for the Columbia Lions and is the program's all-time leading scorer.

Playing career
Jenkins was born in Philadelphia, Pennsylvania. He attended Woodbridge High School in Woodbridge Township, New Jersey, where he is the school's all-time leading scorer.

Jenkins played for the Columbia Lions from 1989 to 1993. He was the Lions' leading scorer in his three final seasons and was named to the first-team All-Ivy League each time. Jenkins was selected as the Ivy League Men's Basketball Co-Player of the Year in 1993 alongside Jerome Allen of the Penn Quakers. He set a Lions record when he scored 47 points during a game against the Harvard Crimson on February 15, 1991. Jenkins' 1,767 career points are the most by a male Lions player. He was inducted into the Columbia Athletics Hall of Fame in 2008.

Jenkins played professionally in Europe for two seasons.

Coaching career
Jenkins worked as an assistant coach for the Columbia Lions after his playing career. He worked for the youth development program Inner Strength, Inc. in Georgia.

Jenkins served as the head coach of the boys junior varsity basketball team at Riverwood International Charter School from 2008 to 2010. He was promoted to the position of boys varsity basketball head coach in 2010.

Personal life
Jenkins' son, Elijah, plays college basketball for the Embry–Riddle Eagles. His daughter, Nailah, plays volleyball for the Northeastern Huskies.

Notes

References

External links
College statistics

1971 births
Living people
American men's basketball coaches
American men's basketball players
Basketball coaches from Pennsylvania
Basketball players from Philadelphia
Columbia Lions men's basketball coaches
Columbia Lions men's basketball players
Guards (basketball)
High school basketball coaches in Georgia (U.S. state)